KLGA-FM (92.7 FM) is a radio station broadcasting an adult contemporary format. Licensed to serve Algona, Iowa, United States, the station is currently owned by A2Z Broadcasting, LLC.

History
The station was first licensed on March 31, 1971.

The station features longtime Morning Host and Farm Director Al Lauck, News with Brian Wilson and Sports with Marc Grandi. They provide sports news, local news, and other relevant items.

References

External links

LGA-FM
Radio stations established in 1971
1971 establishments in Iowa
Riverfront Broadcasting LLC